Cristina Alberdi (born 22 February 1946) is a Spanish politician and lawyer. She served as the 2nd and last minister of social affairs from 1993 to 1996.

Education and career
Graduating in law, from 1970 she was a lawyer of the Colegio de Abogados (School of Lawyers), and in 1975 organized a feminist legal group. She was later a representative of the Consejo General del Poder Judicial, (General Advisory council of the Judiciary) from 1985 to 1990. She was appointed minister of social affairs in the cabinet led by Prime Minister Felipe Gonzales in 1993, replacing Matilde Fernández in the post. Alberdi was in office until 1996.

She was elected to the Spanish Congress as Spanish Socialist Workers' Party (PSOE) member in 1996, representing Malaga district before moving to Madrid district which she represented from 2000 – 2003. She was also president of Federación Socialista Madrileña (1997–2000). In 2003, she left PSOE. As of 2004 she was president of the advisory council against violence in the Community of Madrid (Consejo Asesor del Observatorio contra la Violencia de Género de la Comunidad de Madrid).

See also
 Inés Alberdi – sister

References

External links

Biography at Spanish Congress site

1946 births
Living people
20th-century Spanish lawyers
Women government ministers of Spain
Spanish Socialist Workers' Party politicians
Members of the 6th Congress of Deputies (Spain)
Members of the 7th Congress of Deputies (Spain)
Spanish women lawyers
21st-century Spanish women politicians
Members of the General Council of the Judiciary
20th-century Spanish women politicians
Social affairs ministers of Spain